Seer 4 (Chinese: 赛尔号大电影4：圣魔之战) is a 2014 Chinese animated children's adventure film directed by Wang Zhangjun and Yin Yuqi and based on an online game. It was released on 10 July 2014. The film is part of a film series, being preceded by Seer the Movie 3: Heroes Alliance (2013) and followed by Seer Movie 5: Rise of Thunder (2015).

Roles 
Left is traditional Chinese and Right is Simplied Chinese

Heroes alliance 
Ray(雷伊, 雷伊)

Gaia(蓋亞, 盖亚)

Cassius(卡修斯, 卡修斯)

Blacke(布萊克, 布莱克)

Muse(繆斯, 缪斯)

And Muse is introduced

Cast
Yang Ou
Zhang Anqi
Fan Junhang
Meng Xianglong
You Jun
Yuan Guoqing
Su Xin
Jia Zhichao
Xia Lei
Liu Qin
Yang Menglu

Reception
The film has grossed US$9.18 million in China.

References

2014 animated films
2014 films
2010s adventure films
Animated adventure films
Chinese animated films
Chinese children's films
Animated films based on video games